Cumoniscidae is a family of crustaceans in the class Tantulocarida, classified under the superclass Multicrustacea.  The family was previously known as Deoterthridae, but Cumoniscidae was determined to be senior subjective synonym.

The family contains the following genera: 

Amphitantulus Boxshall & Vader, 1993
Aphotocentor Huys, 1991
Arcticotantulus Kornev, Tchesunov & Rybnikov, 2004
Boreotantulus Huys & Boxshall, 1988
Campyloxiphos Huys, 1991
Coralliotantulus Huys, 1991
Cumoniscus Bonnier, 1903
Deoterthron Bradford & Hewitt, 1980
Dicrotrichura Huys, 1989
Itoitantulus Huys, Ohtsuka Boxshall & Itô, 1992
Tantulacus Huys, Andersen & Kristensen, 1992

The genus Onceroxenus Boxshall & Lincoln, 1987 was previously place in this family but is now placed in the monotypic family Onceroxenidae.

References

Maxillopoda
Crustacean families